Live and Let Live is a 1921 silent American melodrama film, directed by Christy Cabanne. It stars Harriet Hammond, George Nichols, and Dulcie Cooper, and was released on July 3, 1921.

Cast list
 Harriet Hammond as Mary Ryan
 George Nichols as Judge Loomis
 Dulcie Cooper as Jane Loomis
 Harris Gordon as Donald Loomis
 Gerald Pring as Albert Watson
 Dave Winter as Dr. Randall
 Helen Lynch as Lillian Boland
 Josephine Crowell as Mrs. Boland
 Cora Drew as Mrs. Randall
 Helen Muir as The Widow Jones

References

External links

Films directed by Christy Cabanne
Film Booking Offices of America films
American silent feature films
American black-and-white films
Silent American drama films
1921 drama films
1921 films
Melodrama films
1920s English-language films
1920s American films